John Smith is a lost 1922 American silent comedy film produced and distributed by Selznick Pictures and directed by Victor Heerman. The film stars veteran Eugene O'Brien and features an early appearance by Mary Astor.

Cast
 Eugene O'Brien as John Smith
 Vivia Ogden as Cook
 W.J. Ferguson as Butler
 Tammany Young as Chauffeur
 Estar Banks as Mrs. Lang
 Frankie Mann as Maid
 Mary Astor as Irene Mason
 George Fawcett as Haynes
 J. Barney Sherry as Martin Lang
 John Butler as Crook
 Walter Greene as District Attorney
 Warren Cook as Doctor
 Henry Sedley as Lawyer
 Daniel L. Haynes as Gangster

References

External links

Film still, standing: Eugene O'Brien and Mary Astor
Glass slide

1922 films
1922 comedy films
Silent American comedy films
American silent feature films
American black-and-white films
Films directed by Victor Heerman
Lost American films
Selznick Pictures films
1922 lost films
Lost comedy films
1920s American films